Tina Charlie (born Tina Jim in Mono Lake, California; 1869–1962) was a Native North American basketweaver. Affiliated with the Kucadikadi tribe, she wove baskets for her own use and that of others in the tribe. An innovative weaver, she incorporated materials and motifs that were not common in the Mono Lake Paiute basketweaving tradition. In the 1920s, she produced fancy three-rod woven baskets for non-Indian markets and continued making them until her death. In the 1880s, she married Young Charlie, a Paiute man from Yosemite. She was married to the same man as her sister, Nellie. She lived with her sister for the rest of her life, and they likely influenced each other's craft.

In 2006, one of Tina Charlie's baskets sold for a then-record price of $336,250, three times the presale estimate. Another of her baskets sold for $248,250. Both were collected by Ella Cain of Bridgeport, California in the 1920s, and were formerly displayed at the Bridgeport Museum.

Work 
Tina Charlie is recognized as an innovative weaver for her finely crafted baskets. She received recognition during the Yosemite Indian Field Days, for which she was known to enter baby baskets. Competitive events such as these would allow her to earn additional income and reputation. She created one of the earliest-documented negatively patterned baskets at the 1925 and 1926 Yosemite Indian Field Days basketry competitions. The baskets had black backgrounds, using black-dyed bracken fern root as the main sewing material, and patterned with buff-colored sedge root and red-brown split redbud. Her motifs were derived by adapting patterns from the Maidu tradition.

Exhibitions 
This list of exhibitions was sourced from the St. James Guide to Native North American Artists.
Bishop Harvest Days, Bishop, California (1916)
Indian Field Days, Yosemite Valley, California (1925)
Indian Field Days, Yosemite Valley, California (1926)
Indian Field Days, Yosemite Valley, California (1929)
Wai-Pai-Shone Trading Post, Stewart, Nevada (1930s)
Mono County Museum, Bridgeport, California (1970-1988)
Yosemite Museum, Yosemite National Park, California (1971-1996)

Collections 
This list of collections was sourced from the St. James Guide to Native North American Artists.
Redding Museum and Art Center, Redding, California
Yosemite Museum, National Park Service, Yosemite National Park

Further reading 
Books on Charlie include: Tradition and Innovation: A Basket History of the Indians of the Yosemite-Mono Lake Area, by Craig D. Bates and Martha J. Lee, Yosemite, 1990 .

References

External links
Tina Charlie baskets in Bonhams auction catalog

1869 births
1962 deaths
Native American basket weavers
Northern Paiute people
Artists from California
People from Mono County, California
20th-century American women artists
Native American women artists
Women basketweavers
20th-century Native Americans
20th-century Native American women